Theodore Dammann was a politician from the U.S. state of Wisconsin.  He was born in Milwaukee, Wisconsin on November 4, 1869.  The son of a Lutheran pastor, he attended Concordia College, at the time located in Milwaukee, now known as Concordia University Wisconsin, located in Mequon, Wisconsin.  He served as that state's twenty-third Secretary of State, serving six terms from January 3, 1927 to January 2, 1939.  For his first four terms he was a Republican and served under governors Fred R. Zimmerman, Walter J. Kohler, Sr., Philip La Follette and Albert G. Schmedeman.  For his second two terms he was a Progressive and served once again under Governor Philip La Follette.

He resided in Milwaukee, Wisconsin at the time of his election.

References 

Secretaries of State of Wisconsin
Wisconsin Progressives (1924)
20th-century American politicians
Wisconsin Republicans